The 1972 Kilkenny Senior Hurling Championship was the 78th staging of the Kilkenny Senior Hurling Championship since its establishment by the Kilkenny County Board. The draw for the first-round fixtures took place on 2 March 1972. The championship began on 14 May 1972 and ended on 29 October 1972.

Bennettsbridge were the defending champions.

Fenians won the championship after a 3–10 to 1–06 defeat of Bennettsbridge in the final. It was their second championship title overall and their first in two championship seasons.

Team changes

To Championship

Promoted from the Kilkenny Junior Hurling Championship
 Newpark Sarsfields

Results

Semi-finals

Final

References

Kilkenny Senior Hurling Championship
Kilkenny Senior Hurling Championship